After is a 2009 Spanish drama film directed by Alberto Rodríguez which stars Guillermo Toledo, Tristán Ulloa and Blanca Romero.

Plot 
The plot tracks three friends (Julio, Manuel and Ana) nearing their forties with a sort of Peter Pan syndrome and lives full of full of dissatisfaction and loneliness. After they meet up, they embark on an attempt to enjoy the night full of sex, drugs and alcohol.

Cast

Production 
The film is a Tesela PC and La Zanfoña Producciones production. Featuring a budget of around €2.5 million, filming began on 23 June 2008 and wrapped in September 2008. It was fully shot in Seville.

Release 
After screened at the 4th Rome Film Festival on 17 October 2009. Distributed by Alta Films, it was theatrically released in Spain on 23 October 2009.

Reception 
Javier Ocaña of El País wrote that Rodríguez's remarkable fourth feature film, consisting of "a journey into the depths of the night", and "led by three superb performances", is a collection of highly effective (even if sometimes overly marked) symbols.

Sergio F. Pinilla of Cinemanía scored 4 out of 5 stars, summing the film to be "a new generational portrait that revolves around the vertices of an isosceles triangle fumigated by sex, drugs and alcohol", knowing "how to transmit the uneasiness, sensuality and truth of a generation that is emotionally hopeless".

Robert Koehler of Variety assessed that the "aggressively vapid" film "is acid noir with a flashy surface", offering "little except examples of how not to live".

Manuel J. Lombardo of Diario de Sevilla wrote that Rodríguez's realistic style is blurred (Seville "never looked so ghostly"), while, vis-à-vis the performances, he pointed out that Guillermo Toledo's lysergic excesses are offset by Tristán Ulloa's neat academic restraint", while Blanca Romero comes out successful of her portrayal of chronic dissatisfaction.

Accolades 

|-
| align = "center" rowspan = "3" | 2010 || rowspan = "3" | 24th Goya Awards || Best Original Screenplay || Rafael Cobos, Alberto Rodríguez ||  || rowspan = "3" | 
|-
| Best New Actress || Blanca Romero || 
|-
| Best Cinematography || Alex Catalán ||

See also 
 List of Spanish films of 2009

References 

2009 drama films
Spanish drama films
Films set in Seville
Films shot in the province of Seville
2000s Spanish-language films
2000s Spanish films